Winget may refer to:

Windows Package Manager, also known as winget

People with the surname
Don Winget, American astronomer
Jennifer Winget (born 1985), Indian actress
Larry Winget (born 1952), American motivational speaker and writer

See also
Wingett (disambiguation)